Crawford Boyd from Kilwinning is a Scottish former professional footballer.

Crawford Boyd is best known for his time at Dumfries club, Queen of the South The defensive cornerstone of the 1970s returned to Queens during the promotion campaign of 1980–81 to make a total of 321 first team appearances. Boyd played in the same promotion squad as Allan Ball, Iain McChesney and Jimmy Robertson.

Boyd also played two seasons for Hearts including the 1979–80 promotion campaign, making 40 appearances. Boyd had left Palmerston at the start of that campaign, as had his long serving teammate Jocky Dempster.

A product of Largs Thistle, he went to manage the club after his playing career ended.

References

External links 
 
 Crawford Boyd interview and career profile

Queen of the South F.C. players
Heart of Midlothian F.C. players
Living people
Scottish footballers
People from Kilwinning
1952 births
Association football defenders
Footballers from North Ayrshire
Scottish Football League players